Wang Pong–Chon Daen Non-hunting Area is a non-hunting area in Mueang Phetchabun District and Wang Pong District of Phetchabun Province.

Geography
Streams flow east into Pasak River and southwest into Wang Thong River a tributary of the Nan River.

Topography
The total mountained area is 94%, divided into 40% high slope mountain area (upper-slopes, shallow valleys, mountain tops and deeply incised streams) and 54% hill slope area (open slopes, u-shaped valleys and midslope ridges). Plains count for 6%.

Flora
The non-hunting area features dry evergreen forest (61%), mixed deciduous forest (20%), degraded forest (3%), agricultural area (13%), and abandoned farms (3%).

Fauna
Mammals, there are 38 species from 33 families, represented by one species:

Birds, there are some 52 species, of which 22 species of passerine from 21 families, represented by one species:

and 30 species of non-passerine from 25 families, represented by one species:

Reptiles

Location

See also
 List of protected areas of Thailand
 List of Protected Areas Regional Offices of Thailand

References

Non-hunting areas of Thailand
Geography of Phetchabun province
Tourist attractions in Phetchabun province
1987 establishments in Thailand
Protected areas established in 1987